This is a list of flags used historically and currently by the Turkish people and the Turkish authorities.

National flags

Presidential flags

Military flags

Turkish Armed Forces

Turkish Land Forces

Turkish Naval Forces

Turkish Air Force

Gendarmerie General Command

Coast Guard Command

Governmental flags

Historical flags

Other flags

See also
 Flags of the Ottoman Empire
 Flag of Turkey

References 

Turkey
Flags
Flags